Serenade in C major, Op. 10, for string trio (usually violin, viola, cello) (1902), is an early 20th-century five-movement suite by Hungarian composer Ernő Dohnányi. Premiered in Vienna in 1904, year of its first publication, it was written in 1902 during a concert tour to London and Vienna.

Structure
The serenade comprises five movements:

References
Notes

Sources

External links
 

Compositions by Ernst von Dohnányi
1902 compositions
Compositions for string trio
Serenades
Compositions in C major